Sir Henry Lynch, 1st Baronet (died 1635) was an Irish baronet, knight, lawyer, and land agent (i.e. estate manager). Lynch was among the first of his family to become a lawyer, and several of his younger sons followed him into this profession, as did, under his influence, Patrick D'Arcy, Richard Martyn, and Geoffrey Browne and many of the later generations of the Tribes of Galway.

Birth and origins 
Henry was born the eldest of the 12 sons of Nicholas FitzStephen Lynch. His father was mayor of Galway 1584–1585. Henry was a great-grandson of Mayor Arthur Lynch (died 1539). His father's family was one of the 14 merchant families known as the Tribes of Galway. Nothing seems to be known about his mother.

Marriage and children 
In or after 1603 Henry Lynch married Elizabeth, the daughter of Richard Martyn and the widow of James D'Arcy. This made him the stepfather of Patrick D'Arcy.

Henry and Elizabeth had three sons:
Robuck (or Robert) (died 1667), his successor and mayor of Galway for 1638–39.
Nicholas, a student of the Middle Temple in 1634
Maurice, married Janet, youngest daughter of Sir Peter French, knight

—and three daughters:
Elizabeth, married Thomas Lynch, ancestor of the Lynchs of Drimcong
Mary (died 1671), married Geoffrey Browne of Galway
Elinor (died 1692), married Sir Valentine Blake, Baronet of Menlough

Later life 
Lynch was the Galway land agent (i.e. estate manager) for Richard Burke, 4th Earl of Clanricarde. Clanricarde lived in south-east England. He was a mentor to his stepson Patrick D'Arcy and his nephew Richard Martyn, later senior political figures of Confederate Ireland.

Lynch was created a baronet on 8 June 1622 and thus became Sir Henry Lynch, 1st Baronet. Lord Falkland, the Lord Deputy, knighted Sir Henry in 1625. Sir Henry was Recorder of Galway from 1625 to his death in 1635.

He seems to have been the "Sir Henry Lynch", who was one of the 11 Irish agents who in 1628 negotiated with Charles I of England for the Graces. Together with Sir Lucas Dillon he represented Connaught among these agents.

Sir Henry shortly sat for Galway County in the parliament of 1634–1635. He was elected in June 1634 but fell ill and was replaced by Sir Richard Blake in a by-election in December. The parliamentary records indicate that he lived in Galway but also at Castle Carra in County Mayo.

Death and succession 
Sir Henry Lynch died 21 February 1635 and was buried in the church of St Nicholas in Galway. He was succeeded by his eldest son Robert as 2nd Baronet.

Notes and references

Notes

Citations

Sources 

 – 1624 to 1632
 – 1611 to 1625

Further reading 

1635 deaths
Baronets in the Baronetage of Ireland
Irish MPs 1634–1635
People from County Galway
Year of birth missing